Thomas Finlay may refer to:

Thomas Finlay (Cumann na nGaedheal politician) (1893–1932), Irish Cumann na nGaedhael politician and lawyer
Thomas Finlay (judge) (1922–2017), Irish Fine Gael politician and former Supreme Court Chief Justice
Thomas A. Finlay (1848–1940), Irish Catholic priest, economist, philosopher and editor
Tom Finlay (1897–1967), Irish hurler
Thomas Matthew Finlay (1879–1954), Scottish geologist

See also
Tom Finley (1903–1933), American baseball player